SaudiGeoSat 1/HellasSat 4, also known as SaudiGeoSat 1/HellasSat 4 (abbreviated SGS-1/HS-4), is a Saudi and Greek geostationary communication satellite of King Abdulaziz City for Science and Technology (KACST) and HellasSat. It was built by Lockheed Martin and was launched on 5 February 2019 on board Ariane flight VA247.

The satellite will provide Telecommunications capabilities, including television, Internet, telephone and secure communications in the Middle East, South Africa and Europe. It is the 16th Saudi satellite launched into space and the 4th Greek and Cypriot satellite.

Manufacturing 
SGS-1 satellite was developed, manufactured and tested by Lockheed Martin in collaboration with KACST where 11 Saudi engineers were trained and certified by Lockheed Martin.

Launch and Specification 

SGS-1/HS-4 was launched on an Ariane 5 operated by Arianespace from the Centre Spatial Guyanais in French Guiana on Ariane flight VA247.

The satellite weighted  fully fuelled for launch, and it was placed into a geostationary transfer orbit (GTO). It will maintain a geosynchronous orbit at 39.0° East longitude.

References 

Communications satellites
2019 in Saudi Arabia
2019 in Greece
Satellites of Saudi Arabia
Spacecraft launched in 2019
Satellites of Greece
Satellites using the A2100 bus